Penny Baker (born October 5, 1965) is an American model and actress. After being interviewed in Chicago, she was chosen as Playboy's Playmate of the Month for January 1984, the 30th Anniversary Playmate. Her photos were shot by Arny Freytag in New York City, Buffalo, and Los Angeles when she was 17, with written permission from her parents. Her pictorial was titled "Lucky Penny" and it reported her age as 18.

In 1985, she had a cameo in the movie Real Genius, appearing in the pool slide scene. In 1986, she had a role as a high-priced prostitute in The Men's Club.

Baker was once interviewed by the author Martin Amis. According to him, "within a minute I had run out of questions."

Filmography

Film

Television

References

External links
 
 

1965 births
Living people
Actresses from Buffalo, New York
1980s Playboy Playmates
21st-century American women